The discography of American country singer-songwriter Liz Anderson consists of 12 studio albums and 23 singles. Her early songwriting produced hits for Merle Haggard that brought a recording contract from RCA Victor Records in 1964. Her first charting single was 1966's "Go Now Pay Later," which reached number 23 on the Billboard Hot Country Singles chart. The same year, Anderson collaborated with Bobby Bare and Norma Jean on the duet "The Game of Triangles." The song reached the top five of the Billboard country chart. In 1967, she had her biggest solo hit with "Mama Spank," which also reached the country top five. Anderson was also releasing studio albums for RCA. This included her third release, Liz Anderson Sings (1967), which peaked at number 20 on the Billboard Top Country Albums chart. Anderson's fourth studio effort, Cookin' Up Hits, reached number 18 on the same chart. 

Anderson continued having top 40 hit singles on the Billboard country chart through 1968. This included "Tiny Tears" and "Mother, May I." The latter was a duet with her daughter, Lynn Anderson. Anderson recorded several more unsuccessful albums before the release of 1970's Husband Hunting. The album reached number 36 on the country albums survey, her final charting album release. The title track reached number 26 on the Billboard country songs chart, her final top 40 hit. Shortly after its release, she switched to Epic Records and recorded several singles, most notably a country version of "I'll Never Fall in Love Again." Her 1973 Epic release, "Time to Love Again," was her final charting single, reaching number 72 on the country chart. Anderson continued sporadically releasing new studio albums. This included two records of children's music. Her final studio effort was issued in 2004.

Albums

Studio albums

Singles

Notes

References

External links
 Liz Anderson discography at Discogs

Country music discographies
Discographies of American artists